The 2012 NCAA Division I Outdoor Track and Field Championships were the 91st NCAA Division I Men's Outdoor Track and Field Championships and the 31st NCAA Division I Women's Outdoor Track and Field Championships at Drake Stadium in Des Moines, Iowa on the campus of the Drake University from  June 5–8, 2012.

In total, thirty-six different men's and women's track and field events were contested.

Results

Men's events

100 meters
Final results shown, not prelims

200 meters
Final results shown, not prelims

400 meters
Final results shown, not prelims

800 meters
Final results shown, not prelims

1500 meters
Only top eight final results shown; no prelims are listed

5000 meters
Only top eight final results shown

10,000 meters
Only top eight final results shown

3000 meter steeplechase
Only top eight final results shown

Women's events

100 meters
Final results shown, not prelims

Semoy Hackett of Louisiana State University was initially awarded the Bronze but was subsequently disqualified for testing positive for methylhexaneamine.  LSU was forced to vacate their national championship as a result and Hackett was given a doping ban of two-year and four months. Hackett was given a doping ban of two-year and four months. The ban ended 30 April 2015.

200 meters
Final results shown, not prelims

Semoy Hackett of LSU initially placed 5th but was subsequently disqualified for a doping offence.

400 meters
Final results shown, not prelims

800 meters
Final results shown, not prelims

1500 meters
Only top eight final results shown; no prelims are listed

5000 meters
Held on June 8, 2013. Only top eight final results shown

10,000 meters
Only top eight final results shown

3000 meter steeplechase
Only top eight final results shown

See also
 NCAA Division I Men's Outdoor Track and Field Championships 
 NCAA Division I Women's Outdoor Track and Field Championships

References

NCAA Men's Outdoor Track and Field Championship
NCAA Division I Outdoor Track And Field Championships
Iowa Hawkeyes Iowa
NCAA Women's Outdoor Track and Field Championship